Functional leadership theory (Hackman & Walton, 1986; McGrath, 1962) is a theory for addressing specific leader behaviors expected to contribute to organizational or unit effectiveness. This theory argues that the leader's main job is to see that whatever is necessary to group needs is taken care of; thus, a leader can be said to have done their job well when contributing to group effectiveness and cohesion.

Functional leadership theories are developed by studying successful leaders and identifying the actions and behaviors they show. Extensive studies with a large amount of data make it possible to correlate what leaders do, i.e., their actions or functions, with their successful results.

The Functional theory of leadership emphasizes how an organization or task is being led rather than who has been formally assigned a leadership role. In the functional leadership model, leadership does not rest with one person but rests on a set of behaviors by the group that gets things done. Any group member can perform these behaviors so that any member can participate in leadership.

One of the best-known and most influential functional theories of leadership, used in many leadership development programs, is John Adair's "Action-Centred Leadership".

John Adair developed a model of Action-Centred Leadership that has connecting circles that overlap because:
 the task can only be performed by the team and not by one person
 the team can only achieve excellent task performance if all the individuals are fully developed
 the individuals need the task to be challenged and motivated

Adair's model challenged trait theory by focusing on what leaders do. He showed that leadership could be taught and did not depend on a person's traits.

The eight functions of leadership

Adair noted the following 8 key functions for which team leaders are responsible. (Examples are given in brackets)

 Defining the task, (by setting clear objectives through SMART goals)
 Planning, (by looking at alternative ways to achieve the task and having contingency plans in case of problems)
 Briefing the team, (by creating the right team climate, fostering synergy, and making the most of each individual through knowing them well)
 Controlling what happens, (by being efficient in terms of getting maximum results from minimum resources)
 Evaluating results, (by assessing consequences and identifying how to improve performance)
 Motivating individuals, (by using both external motivators such as rewards and incentives as well as eliciting internal motivators on the part of each team player)
 Organizing people, (by organizing self and others through good time management, personal development, and delegation)
 Setting an example, (by recognizing that people observe their leaders and copy what they do).

Criticism of the model

Some people consider Adair's Three Circles Model too simplistic and outdated as it was developed in the 1970s.

Implications for the nature versus nurture debate

Whether leaders are born or made is part of the question of whether human behavior is due to nature or nurture. It is a short leap from functional leadership theory to the belief that if one person can do something, others can also learn to do it. The implication that leaders are made and not necessarily born with the necessary traits for leadership opened up the possibility of leadership development.

References

 http://www.johnadair.co.uk/profiles.html
 Hackman, J. R., & Walton, R. E. (1986). Leading groups in organizations. In P. S. Goodman, & Associates (Eds.), Designing influential workgroups
 (pp. 72–119). San Francisco, CA: Jossey-Bass.
 McGrath, J. E. (1962). Leadership behavior: Requirements for leadership training. Prepared for U.S. Civil Service Commission Office of Career
 Development, Washington, D.C.. ⁎
 Adair, J. (1973) Action-Centred Leadership. New York, McGraw-Hill.
 AstraZeneca (1999) Leadership in AstraZeneca. AstraZeneca HR, Dec 1999.
 Bass, B. (1985) Leadership and Performance Beyond Expectations. New York: Free Press.
 Bergmann, H., Hurson, K., and Russ-Eft, D. (1999) everyone a Leader: A grassroots model for the new workplace. New York: John Wiley and Sons.
 Blackler, F., and Kennedy, A. (2003) The Design of a Development Programme for Experienced Top Managers from the Public Sector. Working Paper, Lancaster University.
 Department for Education and Skills (2003) Management and Leadership Attributes Framework. DfES Leadership and Personnel Division, April 2003.
 Deutsche Lufthansa AG (1998) Leading With Goals: Lufthansa Leadership Compass. FRA PU/D, July 1998.
 Katzenbach, J. and Smith, D. (1994) the Wisdom of Teams. New York: Harper Business.
 Lewin, K. (1935) A Dynamic Theory of Personality. New York, McGraw Hill.
 Tichy, N. and Devanna, M. (1986) Transformational Leadership. New York: Wiley.

Human resource management